Iván Tóth (born 22 March 1971, Budapest) is a retired Hungarian goalkeeper.

Club career
More Hungarian footballers with a first class were playing in a club. A professional footballer started his career on Vác in 1996, saved in a team with more lower classes then. It returned in 2003 into NB I, where first the Szombathelyi Haladás was a basis man, then the Budapest Honvéd FC was in his team goalkeeper, where there was a later team captain and the team may say thank you for more successes to him.

Club honours

III. Kerületi TUE
Hungarian National Championship II:
3rd place: 1997–98

Budaörsi SC
Pest Megyei I:
Winner: 2001–02

Budapest Honvéd FC
Hungarian Cup:
Winner: 2006–07, 2008–09
Runners-up: 2007–08
Hungarian Super Cup:
Runners-up: 2007, 2009

References
Iván Tóth Career Stats at Nemzeti Sport 
Iván Tóth Career Stats at HLSZ 

1971 births
Living people
Footballers from Budapest
Hungarian footballers
Association football goalkeepers
Vác FC players
III. Kerületi TUE footballers
Törökbálint FC footballers
Budaörsi SC footballers
Százhalombattai LK footballers
Szombathelyi Haladás footballers
Lombard-Pápa TFC footballers
Budapest Honvéd FC players
Budapest Honvéd FC II players